Nyctemera trita is a moth of the family Erebidae first described by Francis Walker in 1854. It is found on Malacca, Java, Sumatra and Lombok.

Subspecies
Nyctemera trita trita (Java, Lombok)
Nyctemera trita tritoides Heylaerts, 1890 (Sumatra)
Nyctemera trita harca (Swinhoe, 1893) (Malacca)

References

Nyctemerina
Moths described in 1854